Coming Up for Air is the debut album by British progressive rock band Breathing Space but the second album to carry the 'Breathing Space' name as Iain Jennings' 2005 solo album was also titled Breathing Space and the band he formed took that name to tour the album. However, this album is the first one produced as a full band.

Track listing
"Coming up for Air" (Jennings/Sparnenn) – 6:04
"When I Hold on to You" (Jennings/Rowen/Sparnenn) – 4:09
"On the Blue Horizon" (Rowen/Sparnenn) – 6:02
"Time Tells all the Unknown" (Jennings/Sparnenn) – 4:47
"Rain Song" (Sparnenn) – 5:40
"The Senses" (Jennings/Sparnenn) – 4:24
"Don't Turn a Blind Eye" (Rowen/Sparnenn) – 6:03
"Head Above the Water" (Jennings) – 6:26
"Searching for my Shadow" (Jennings/Sparnenn) – 5:13
"Turn of the Tide" (Jennings/Rowen) – 3:43

Credits (taken directly from the sleeve notes)
Olivia Sparnenn – lead and backing vocals
Mark Rowen – lead, rhythm, acoustic guitars
Paul Teasdale – bass guitars
Iain Jennings – keyboards
Ben Jennings – keyboards
Barry Cassells – drums

Additional personnel
Liam Davison – slide guitar (Track 7)
John Hart – saxophone (6 and 8); Flute (10)

2007 albums
Breathing Space albums